Inositol oxygenase, also commonly referred to as myo-inositol oxygenase (MIOX), is a non-heme di-iron enzyme that oxidizes myo-inositol to glucuronic acid.  The enzyme employs a unique four-electron transfer at its Fe(II)/Fe(III) coordination sites and the reaction proceeds through the direct binding of myo-inositol followed by attack of the iron center by diatomic oxygen. This enzyme is part of the only known pathway for the catabolism of inositol in humans and is expressed primarily in the kidneys. Recent medical research regarding MIOX has focused on understanding its role in metabolic and kidney diseases such as diabetes, obesity and acute kidney injury. Industrially-focused engineering efforts are centered on improving MIOX activity in order to produce glucaric acid in heterologous hosts.

Structure

 
Myo-inositol oxygenase is a monomeric 33 kDa protein in both solution and crystal. This enzyme possesses a Fe(II)/Fe(III) atomic pair at the catalytic active site which enables its unique four-electron transfer mechanism. Recent crystallization studies have elucidated the structures of the mouse MIOX  in 2006 followed by the human MIOX in 2008.

The overall structure of the mouse MIOX is primarily helical with five alpha helices forming the core of the protein. Like other di-iron oxygenases, the iron coordination centers are buried deep inside the protein presumably to protect the cell from the superoxide and radical reaction intermediates that are formed. The two iron centers are coordinated by various amino acids and water molecules as shown in complex with the myo-inositol substrate. The human MIOX structure superimposes closely onto the mouse MIOX structure, sharing 86% sequence identity over the structural alignment but with some differences in the residues surrounding the active site. The human enzyme is characterized by eight alpha helices and a small anti-parallel two-stranded beta sheet.

the MIOX protein fold diverges from that of other non-heme di-iron oxygenases including ribonucleotide reductase and soluble methane monooxygenase. Instead, MIOX closely resembles proteins in the HD-domain superfamily based on its highly conserved metal binding strategy and the presence of the four His ligands on the iron center.

Mechanism

MIOX can accept D-myo-inositol as well as the less abundant chiro isomer of inositol as substrates. A series of crystallization, spectroscopy and density functional theory experiments have revealed a putative mechanism (shown right) for the oxidation of myo-inositol. ENDOR spectroscopy was used to determine that the substrate directly binds to the Fe(II)/Fe(III) di-iron center of MIOX most likely through the O1 atom of myo-inositol.  In the mouse MIOX, this binding process was shown to be dependent on proximal amino acid residues as alanine mutants D85A and K127A were unable to turnover substrate. This binding step positions the myo-inositol prior to the catalytic steps which involve attack of an iron center by diatomic oxygen followed by abstraction of a myo-inositol hydrogen atom.

A superoxide Fe(III)/Fe(III) species is formed as diatomic oxygen displaces water as a coordinating ligand on one of the Fe atoms. Next, the hydrogen atom from C1 of myo-inositol is abstracted to generate a radical that can be attacked by an oxygen radical. Release of D-glucuronic acid is achieved in the fourth step.

Biological Function
Myo-inositol can be ingested from fruits and vegetables and actively transported into cells or instead directly synthesized from glucose. In the kidney, MIOX converts myo-inositol to glucuronic acid which is then able to enter the glucuronate-xylulose pathway for conversion to xylulose-5-phosphate. This product can then easily enter the pentose phosphate pathway. Hence, MIOX enables the conversion and catabolism of inositol to generate NADPH and other pentose sugars.

Disease Relevance.

Myo-inositol is a component of the inositol phosphates and phosphoinositides that serve as secondary messengers in many cellular processes including insulin action. Due to its exclusive expression in the kidney, research has focused on understanding the potential role of both myo-inositol levels and MIOX activity on metabolic diseases like diabetes mellitus and obesity. Depletion of MIOX and accumulation of polyols, such as inositol and xylitol, have been cited as contributing factors in complications associated with diabetes. Additionally, a recent study has shown that MIOX is upregulated in the diabetic state with its transcription heavily regulated by osmolarity, glucose levels and oxidative stress. This upregulation is associated with the formation of reactive oxidative species that lead to interstitial injury in the kidney.

There is also interest in evaluating MIOX expression as a potential biomarker of acute kidney injury. MIOX expression was shown to increase in the serum of animals and plasma of critically ill patients within 24 hours of acute kidney injury specifically. An immunoassay of MIOX expression may potentially predict these life-threatening injuries earlier than the current diagnostic—detection of plasma creatinine.

Industrial Relevance 

The MIOX enzyme has been the object of intense metabolic engineering efforts to produce glucaric acid through biosynthetic pathways. In 2004, the U.S. Department of Energy released a list of the top value-added chemicals from biomass which included glucaric acid—the direct product of the oxidation of glucuronic acid. The first biosynthetic production of glucaric acid was achieved in 2009 with use of the uronate dehydrogenase (UDH) enzyme. Since then, the MIOX enzyme has been engineered for improved glucaric acid production through numerous strategies including appendage of an N-terminal SUMO-tag, directed evolution and also the use of modular, synthetic scaffolds to increase its effective local concentration.

See also 
 Inositol
 Glucuronic acid
 Oxygenases

References

External links 
 

EC 1.13.99